Larijan (also Romanized as Larījān and Lārījān; also known as Lirīān) is a village in Baqerabad Rural District, in the Central District of Mahallat County, Markazi Province, Iran. At the 2006 census, its population was 597, in 166 families.

References 

Populated places in Mahallat County